The Frontier Conference, known as the New Mexico Conference and New Mexico Intercollegiate Conference from 1940 to 1955, was an intercollegiate athletic conference composed of member schools located in the states of Arizona, Colorado, New Mexico, Oklahoma, and Texas. The league existed from 1940 to 1962.

Membership

Former members
The following is an incomplete list of the membership of the Frontier Conference.

Membership timeline

Football championships and postseason appearances

See also
List of defunct college football conferences

References

 
1940 establishments in the United States
Organizations established in 1940
Organizations disestablished in 1962